Heidi Ann Swank (born 1968 in Prescott, Wisconsin) is an American politician who served as a Democratic member of the Nevada Assembly, who represented 16th district from February 4, 2013, to November 4, 2020.

Education
Swank graduated from Prescott High School and earned her BA from Hamline University. She earned her MA and Ph.D. from Northwestern University.

Elections
When Democratic Assemblyman John Oceguera ran for the United States House of Representatives and left the District 16 seat open, Swank won the three-way June 12, 2012 Democratic primary and won the November 6, 2012 general election with 9,649 votes (71.43%) against Republican nominee Ben Boarman.

References

External links
Official page at the Nevada Legislature
Campaign site
 

Date of birth missing (living people)
1968 births
Living people
Hamline University alumni
Democratic Party members of the Nevada Assembly
Northwestern University alumni
Politicians from Las Vegas
People from Prescott, Wisconsin
Women state legislators in Nevada
21st-century American politicians
21st-century American women politicians